The Federal Coffee Palace was a large elaborate Second Empire  style temperance hotel in the city centre of Melbourne, Victoria, built in 1888 at the height of Melbourne's Boom era, and controversially demolished in 1973. Located on Collins Street, Melbourne's premier thoroughfare, on the corner of King Street, near Spencer Street Station (the address is now 555 Collins Street), it is prominent in lists of the buildings Melburnians most regret having lost.

Design & construction 
In June 1885, the local businessmen and politicians James Mirams and James Munro established the Federal Coffee Palace Company, and announced their intention to issue £100,000 of shares to buy the plot on the corner of Collins and King, and build a seven-storey  temperance hotel to the design of Tappin Gilbert and Dennehy, that would be 'the finest in the city'. In November 1885, perhaps not satisfied with that design, the Company held a competition, with 13 entries; the first prize was awarded to Ellerker & Kilburn, and the second to William Pitt, who then worked together to design 'the massive edifice', though the exterior is much as Ellerker & Kilburn designed it. Construction began in early 1886, and it opened in July 1888, in time for Melbourne's Centennial Exhibition, which opened at the Exhibition Buildings on the 1st August.

The exterior stucco facades included sculpted figures, and multiple setbacks to relieve its great bulk, dominated by a lofty corner domed turret that was 165ft high, and topped by Second Empire mansard roofs. The interior had a huge, four storey lobby with a grand staircase, and impressively appointed dining and entertaining rooms. The hotel had 370 guest bedrooms, with a penthouse suite in the tower at the top of the building. The construction took five million bricks and cost £110,000.

The Federal Coffee Palace was by far the largest and grandest product of the late 19th century temperance movement in Australia that saw numerous Coffee Palaces built all over the country, but particularly in Victoria, with examples in most country towns and Melbourne suburbs. All built in the boom years of the 1880s, often in competition with nearby hotels that did sell alcohol, once the Boom of the 1880s became the Crash of the 1890s, many struggled to remain viable, and often eventually gave up on the temperance aspect of the business. In 1897 the Federal gained a wine licence, and changed its name to the Federal Palace Hotel, and in 1923 after years of attempts, it finally became fully licensed.

Demolition 

Located at the warehouse /shipping end of the CBD, far from the shopping and recreation centres, and with a decline in country railway passengers arriving at Spencer Street Station, the Federal struggled to remain viable. Renovations in the late 1960s did not save the hotel from this declining popularity, and Federal Hotels P/L sold it to developers in 1971. Closure and demolition for an office development was announced in 1972, demolition completed in 1973, and the 23 storey Enterprise House was completed by 1975. In 2017 approval for the replacement of that building with a 46 level hotel and apartment tower was granted. In 2019 the design changed to a 35 level office building with retail at ground level.

Some elements of the building were carefully removed by Whelan the Wrecker; three of the four female statues by modeller Charles William Scurry were relocated to the then new Chateau Commodore in Lonsdale Street, and when that changed hands over 20 years later, they were donated to the McClelland Sculpture Park and Gallery in Langwarrin outside Frankston, Victoria in 1996, and a panel of the cast-iron stair balustrade (with 'FCP' in the pattern) was donated by Myles Whelan to the Museum of Victoria in 1992.

Gallery

See also
 Architecture of Melbourne
Coffee Palace
Photos  taken in 1972 by Graeme Butler shortly before demolition on Flickr

References 

Hotels in Melbourne
Hotel buildings completed in 1888
Buildings and structures demolished in 1973
Australian architectural history
Demolished buildings and structures in Melbourne
Demolished hotels in Australia
Temperance movement
Coffeehouses and cafés in Australia